The Church of St Andrew in Brympton, Somerset, England, dates from the 13th century and has been designated as a Grade I listed building.

It is closely associated with the manor house of Brympton d'Evercy. The d'Evercy family were responsible for building the church. Thomas d'Evercy purchased the estate in 1220. New aisles were added in 1469.

It has been suggested that this is the building today known as the priest house, but no structural evidence exists to support this claim. The church contains monuments to Sir John Sydenham (died 1626) and his family who were lords of the manor.

Some of the effigies within the church were originally in the churchyard but were moved into the church in the 19th century and restored by John Edward Carew.

The parish is within the benefice of Odcombe with Brympton, Lufton and Montacute, which is within the deanery of Yeovil.

See also
 Brympton d'Evercy
 Grade I listed buildings in South Somerset
 List of Somerset towers
 List of ecclesiastical parishes in the Diocese of Bath and Wells

References

External links
 

13th-century church buildings in England
Church of England church buildings in South Somerset
Grade I listed churches in Somerset
Grade I listed buildings in South Somerset